City of Newcastle upon Tyne Act 2000 is an Act to confer powers on the Council of the City of Newcastle upon Tyne for the better control of street trading in the city of Newcastle; for the registration of door supervisors and second-hand goods dealers in the city; for controlling the distribution of free literature in the city; and for other purposes.

Notes

References

Politics of Newcastle upon Tyne